Peoria is an unincorporated community and census-designated place (CDP) in Linn County, Oregon, United States. It is on the right bank of the Willamette River at river mile 141 between Eugene and Corvallis. As of the 2010 census, the population was 94.

Demographics

History
Peoria, named for Peoria, Illinois, was first settled in 1851 by H. A. McCartney.  By 1875, the community was prosperous enough to have four grain warehouses and a school with 60 pupils. However, after the Oregon and California Railroad established a line through Shedd and Halsey further east, business in Peoria declined.

A post office in this vicinity opened in 1855 under the name "Burlington". The name was changed to "Peoria" in 1857, and the office closed in 1900. Through the early decades of the 20th century, a river ferry operated out of Peoria.

References

External links
Historic images of Peoria from the Salem Public Library
Images of Peoria from the University of Oregon digital archives
Images of Peoria from Flickr

Unincorporated communities in Linn County, Oregon
Unincorporated communities in Oregon
Census-designated places in Oregon
Census-designated places in Linn County, Oregon